The Prospect Trust is a multi-academy trust of 3 primary, secondary and sixth form academies in and around Surrey and Hampshire. Formed in 2017, they are currently educating 4,860 students.

Description 
The Prospect Trust was formed as a consequence of the government's North and mid-Hampshire further education area review in order to enable The Sixth Form College Farnborough to convert to academy status. Following explorations of working more closely with local schools, a detailed review was launched around collaboration with Tomlinscote School. From 1 September 2018, Tomlinscote School joined The Prospect Trust. After negotiations between the school, Guildford Diocese, Surrey County Council and The Prospect Trust, the Department for Education approved Frimley CofE Junior School to join The Prospect Trust from 1 April 2021.

The Trust is a company limited by guarantee and an exempt charity.

The Chief Executive Officer is Simon Jarvis, a former principal of The Sixth Form College Farnborough.

Schools

Primary schools 

 Frimley CofE Junior School, Surrey

Secondary schools 

 Tomlinscote School, Surrey

Sixth forms 

 The Sixth Form College Farnborough, Hampshire

Results 
The Sixth Form College Farnborough has an "Above average" government progress score for A levels, with an average result of B−.

Tomlinscote School has an "Average" government Progress 8 score but with 54% of pupils achieving Grade 5 or above in English & maths GCSEs compared to the local authority average of 52%.

No data has been collected from Frimley CofE Junior school since converting to an academy.

References

External links 

 The Prospect Trust Website
 The Sixth Form College Farnborough Website
 Tomlinscote School Website
 Frimley CofE Junior School Website

 
Educational charities based in the United Kingdom